The 2015–16 Saint Francis Red Flash men's basketball team represented Saint Francis University during the 2015–16 NCAA Division I men's basketball season. The Red Flash, led by fourth year head coach Rob Krimmel, played their home games at the DeGol Arena and were members of the Northeast Conference. They finished the season 13–17, 9–9 in NEC play to finish in a tie for sixth place. They lost in the quarterfinals of the NEC tournament to Fairleigh Dickinson.

Roster

Schedule

|-
!colspan=9 style="background:#990000; color:#FFFFFF;"| Non-conference regular season

|-
!colspan=9 style="background:#990000; color:#FFFFFF;"| NEC regular season

|-
!colspan=9 style="background:#990000; color:#FFFFFF;"| NEC tournament

References

Saint Francis Red Flash men's basketball seasons
Saint Francis (PA)